Kidnapping Freddy Heineken (U.S. title Kidnapping Mr. Heineken) is a 2015 British-Dutch crime drama film directed by Daniel Alfredson based on the 1983 kidnapping of Freddy Heineken. The screenplay, based on the 1987 book by Peter R. de Vries, was written by William Brookfield. The role of Freddy Heineken is played by Anthony Hopkins, with Sam Worthington as Willem Holleeder, Jim Sturgess as Cor van Hout, Ryan Kwanten as Jan Boellaard, Thomas Cocquerel as Martin Erkamps and Mark van Eeuwen as Frans Meijer.

Plot

The film takes place in 1983, primarily in Amsterdam, and centres on a group of five Dutch friends: Willem Holleeder, Cor van Hout, Jan Boellard, Martin Erkamps and Frans Meijer. Looking for easy money, they decide to kidnap the Heineken owner and tycoon Freddy Heineken to achieve a very high ransom. Although capturing Heineken and his driver Ab Doderer successfully, the group eventually face difficulties due to a lack of experience in crime. They fail to negotiate with the police, and Cor feels it is his duty to take care of his pregnant wife, Sonja. After Heineken is finally released by the police, Willem and Cor flee to Paris, where they plan to remain hidden. However, Cor experiences strong emotions to telephone Sonja, a dangerous action that could easily reveal their location to the police tracing. He is initially reluctant and has arguments with Willem, but ultimately gives in to his feelings and calls Sonja, resulting in Cor and Willem being arrested by the French police when leaving their apartment. According to the final headline, Freddy Heineken died in 2003; he actually died in 2002.

Cast
Anthony Hopkins as Freddy Heineken
Sam Worthington as Willem Holleeder
Jim Sturgess as Cor van Hout
Ryan Kwanten as Jan Boellard
Jemima West as Sonja Holleeder
Thomas Cocquerel as Martin Erkamps
Mark van Eeuwen as Frans Meijer
David Dencik as Ab Doderer
Billy Slaughter as Junior Officer
Eric Godon as The cop

Production
Filming began in Belgium in October 2013. Most of the outside action scenes were filmed on location in Amsterdam.

Reception
Kidnapping Mr. Heineken received generally unfavourable reviews from critics. The film has a 33/100 score at Metacritic and a 19% score at Rotten Tomatoes.

The Los Angeles Times commented, "Despite its true-events pedigree, Kidnapping Mr. Heineken is woefully captive to B-movie crime saga tropes."

Variety wrote, "About as appealing as day-old beer littered with cigarette butts, the abysmal caper drama Kidnapping Mr. Heineken is one of those international co-productions produced for all the right tax-credit reasons and none of the right artistic ones."

Frank Scheck of The Hollywood Reporter wrote, "By the time the relatively brief but seemingly interminable proceedings reach their conclusion, viewers may feel like they've been held hostage themselves." Conversely, Rex Reed of The New York Observer gave the film 3 out of 4 stars, and commented, "Anthony Hopkins plays the king of the hops, and he is excellent. So is the rest of the movie, a sober, no-frills account about the highest ransom ever collected up to that time—$10 million and counting."

References

External links

2015 films
2015 crime drama films
British crime drama films
Dutch crime drama films
Crime films based on actual events
English-language Dutch films
Films directed by Daniel Alfredson
Films set in the Netherlands
Films set in Amsterdam
Films shot in Amsterdam
Films about hostage takings
Films set in 1983
Films scored by Lucas Vidal
Films based on non-fiction books
Films based on works by Dutch writers
2010s English-language films
2010s British films